Pterostylis glebosa, commonly known as the clubbed snail orchid, is a species of orchid endemic to the south-west of Western Australia. Non-flowering plants have a rosette of leaves flat on the ground but flowering plants usually lack a rosette and have a single green and white flower with club-like lateral sepals. It sometimes forms colonies of thousands of plants.

Description
Pterostylis glebosa is a terrestrial, perennial, deciduous, herb with an underground tuber which sometimes forms colonies of thousands of plants. The dorsal sepal and petals are fused, forming a hood or "galea" over the column, the dorsal sepal with a blunt tip. The labellum is relatively small and narrow but is not visible from outside the flower. Flowering occurs from August to October.

Taxonomy and naming
Pterostylis glebosa was first formally described in 2014 by David Jones and Christopher French from a specimen collected near Gingin and the description was published in Australian Orchid Review. The species had previously been known as Pterostylis sp. 'clubbed snail orchid'. The specific epithet (glebosa) is a Latin word meaning "lumpy" referring to the swollen tips of the lateral sepals.

Distribution and habitat
The clubbed snail orchid usually grows in swampy places, often amongst sedges and under Melaleuca species, sometimes with part of its flowering stem in shallow water. It occurs between Eneabba and Manjimup in the Jarrah Forest and Swan Coastal Plain biogeographic regions.

Conservation
Pterostylis glebosa is listed as "not threatened" by the Government of Western Australia Department of Parks and Wildlife.

References

glebosa
Endemic orchids of Australia
Orchids of Western Australia
Plants described in 2014